Seven Mountains may refer to:

Seven Mountains, Bergen, seven mountains surrounding the Norwegian city of Bergen 
Seven Mountains (album), 2015 album by Swiss band 77 Bombay Street
"Seven Mountains" (song), title track and 2015 single by 77 Bombay Street from the same titled album Seven Mountains 
Bảy Núi, also known as Thất Sơn, both of which mean "seven mountains" in Vietnamese

See also
Seven Devils Mountains, notable peaks in west central Idaho in the Hells Canyon Wilderness
Suzuka Seven Mountains, main peaks of the Suzuka Mountains in Japan
Suite for the Seven Mountains, 2008 debut album by Norwegian saxophonist Marius Neset
Seven Mountains Media, American media company owning number of country music radio stations mostly in Pennsylvania
The Seven Storey Mountain, 1948 autobiography of the Trappist monk Thomas Merton
Seven Mountain Mandate, a dominionist movement within evangelical Christianity